Baroni is a surname of Italian origin. It may refer to:
Alex Baroni (1966-2002), Italian singer
Angela Baroni (born 1979), Italian sailor
Anna Lisa Baroni (1959), Italian politician
Bill Baroni (born 1971), American Republican Party politician
Cristian Oliveira Baroni (born 1983), Brazilian footballer
Francesca Baroni (born 1999), Italian professional racing cyclist
Msgr. Geno Baroni (1930–1984)), American Roman Catholic priest and social activist
Gianmario Baroni (1910–1950), Italian ice hockey player
Giuseppe Baroni (18th century), Italian engraver
Juliana Baroni (born 1978), Brazilian actress
Leonora Baroni (1611–1670), Italian singer, musician, and composer
Mario Baroni (1927–1994), Italian racing cyclist
Phil Baroni (born 1976), American mixed martial arts fighter
Raphaël Baroni (born 1970), Swiss narratologist
Riccardo Baroni (born 1998), Italian professional footballer
Tomás Baroni (born 1995), Argentine professional footballer 
Valeria Baroni (born 1989), Argentine actress, singer and dancer

Italian-language surnames